The container compression test measures the compressive strength of packages such as boxes, drums, and cans.  It usually provides a plot of  deformation vs compressive force.

It is commonly used to evaluate shipping containers made of corrugated fiberboard as well as wooden boxes and crates.  Industrial and consumer packages  other than boxes can also be subjected to compression testing: drum, pail, bottle, tub etc.  Package components are also evaluated for compression resistance.

It is usually a laboratory test involving a special machine, a compression tester, to apply controlled compression on a test specimen.  A universal testing machine is sometimes configured to perform a package compression test.   Compression testing  can also involve a superimposed dead load to a test package.

Test procedures
A common method of conducting the test, as described in several published standard test methods, is to compress a box at a constant rate of 1/2 inch (12.5 mm) per minute between two rigid platens.  The platens can be fixed so that they remain parallel or one can be pivoted or "floating".  The test can be conducted on empty or filled boxes, with or without a box closure.  Conditioning to standard temperature and humidity is important.

The results of the constant rate of compression test can be:
 The peak load
 The deformation at peak load
 The load at a critical deformation (head space, etc.)
 The ability of a container to protect the contents from compression damage
 etc.
The dynamic loads have some relationship with expected field loads.: often factors of 4 or 5 are used to estimate the allowable working load on boxes.

A test can also be conducted with platens that are not mechanically driven but are free to move with a fixed mass (or fixed force) loaded upon them. The results of static load testing can be:
 The time to failure
 The time to a critical deformation
 The ability of a container to protect the contents from compression damage
 etc.

As with any laboratory testing field validation is necessary to determine suitability.

Corrugated box testing
Corrugated shipping containers are exposed to compression hazards during storage and shipment.  Proper compression strength is a key performance factor.

Factors potentially affecting test results
 Size and construction of the specific shipping container under test
 Grade and flute structure of corrugated fiberboard
 moisture content of the corrugated board (based on relative humidity)
 Orientation of the box during the test
 Inner supports, if used during testing (wood, corrugated board, cushioning)
 Contents (when box is tested with contents)
 Box closure
 Whether the compression machine has "fixed" or "floating" (swiveled) platens.
 Previous handling or testing of box
Vent and hand holes
 etc.

Estimations
Corrugated fiberboard can be evaluated by many material test methods including an Edge Crush Test (ECT). There have been efforts to estimate the peak compression strength of a box (usually empty, regular singelwall slotted containers, top-to-bottom) based on various board properties.  Some have involved finite element analysis. One of the commonly referenced empirical estimations was published by McKee in 1963.   This used the board ECT, the MD and CD flexural stiffness, the box perimeter, and the box depth.  Simplifications have used a formula involving the board ECT, the board thickness, and the box perimeter.  Most estimations do not relate well to other box orientations, box styles, or to filled boxes.  Physical testing of filled and closed boxes remains necessary.

Calculating compression requirement
Fiber Box Association have a method for calculating the required compression losses which includes the following factors:
 Time
 Moisture
 Palletizing type
 Pallet patterns
 Pallet type
 Handling

Dynamic compression
Containers can be subjected to compression forces that involve distribution dynamics.  For example, a package may be impacted by an object being dropped onto it (vertical load) or impacted by freight sliding into it (horizontal load). Vehicle vibration can involve  a stack of containers and create dynamic compression responses. Package testing methods are available to evaluate these compression  dynamics.

See also
Corrugated box design
Corrugated fiberboard
Package testing
Plane strain compression test

References

Relevant Standards
ASTM Standard D642 Test Method for Determining Compressive Resistance of Shipping Containers, Components, and Unit Loads.
ASTM Standard D4577 Test Method for Compression Resistance of a Container Under Constant Load
ASTM Standard D7030 Test Method for Short Term Creep Performance of Corrugated Fiberboard Containers Under Constant Load Using a Compression Test Machine
German Standard DIN 55440-1 Packaging Test; compression test; test with a constant conveyance-speed
ISO 12048  Packaging—Complete, filled transport packages—Compression and stacking tests using a compression tester

Further reading

Soroka, W, "Fundamentals of Packaging Technology", IoPP, 2002, 
Urbanik, T. J, and Frank, B, "Box Compression Analysis of World Wide Data", Wood and Fiber Science, 2006, 
 Yam, K.L., "Encyclopedia of Packaging Technology", John Wiley & Sons, 2009,

External links
 Package Compression Testing 

Paper products
Packaging materials
Containers